Sir Reginald Oswald Palmer GCMG MBE (15 February 1923 – 23 May 2016) was the governor-general of Grenada from 6 August 1992 to 8 August 1996.

Biography
Beginning his career in education, first as a pupil teacher he went on to become the head teacher of St. George's Roman Catholic School in 1956. In 1972 he was promoted to the government post of Assistant Education Officer and then in 1973 was made Principal of the Grenada Teacher's College. The following year he was again promoted, becoming the government Chief Education Officer. Palmer retired from public service in 1980 and entered the private sector, serving two terms as President of the Grenada Employer's Federation. He died in May 2016 at the age of 93.

Notes 

1923 births
2016 deaths
Governors-General of Grenada
Knights Grand Cross of the Order of St Michael and St George
Members of the Order of the British Empire